Beat, beats or beating may refer to:

Common uses 

 Assault, inflicting physical harm or unwanted physical contact
 Battery (crime), a criminal offense involving unlawful physical contact 
 Battery (tort), a civil wrong in common law of intentional harmful or offensive contact
 Corporal punishment, punishment intended to cause physical pain 
 Patrol, or beat, a group of personnel assigned to monitor a specific area
 Beat (police), the territory that a police officer patrols
 Gay beat, an area frequented by gay men 
 Strike (attack), repeatedly  and violently striking a person or object
 Victory, success achieved in personal combat, military operations or in any competition

People
 Beat (name), a Swiss German male given name
 Jackie Beat, drag persona of Kent Fuher (born 1963)
 Aone Beats (born 1984) Nigerian record producer
 Billy Beats (1871-1936) British footballer
 Cohen Beats (Michael Cohen, born 1986), Israeli record producer
 Eno Beats (Enock Kisakye, born 1991), Ugandan record producer
 Laxio Beats (Bernard Antwi-Darko, born 1987), Ghanaian record producer
 Mizz Beats (Iman Yanee, fl. from 2004), British record producer
 Rico Beats (Ricardo Lamarre, fl. from 2004), American record producer

Arts, entertainment and media

Fictional characters  
 Beat, in video game Eternal Sonata
 Beat, in the game Jet Set Radio
 Beat, in the game The World Ends with You 
 Beat, a robot bird in the Mega Man series

Film 
 Beat (1997 film), a South Korean action film
 Beat (1998 film), a 1998 Japanese film
 Beat (2000 film), a film about writer William Seward Burroughs
 Beat (TV series), a 2018 German thriller series
 Beats (2019 British film), based on the play by Kieran Hurley
 Beats (2019 American film), a coming-of-age drama 
 Beat (filmmaking), a small amount of action resulting in a pause in dialogue

Music

Groups
 Beat (band), a Finnish band
 The Beat (British band)
 The Beat (American band)

Albums and songs 
 Beat (Bowery Electric album), 1996
 Beat (King Crimson album), 1982
 "Beat" (song), by Kaela Kimura, 2005
 "Beats", a song by AJR from the 2019 album Neotheater

Music channels 
 Beats Music, an Apple music streaming service
 MTV Beats, music TV channel of India
 Beat 102 103, an Irish radio station

Other uses in music 
 Beat (music), the basic time in music and music theory
 Beat music, a popular music genre
 Drum beat, a rhythmic pattern

Other uses in arts, entertainment and media
 Beat, an intentional pause for emphasis in comic timing
 Beats (video game), 2007 
 Unit of action, or beat, in acting

Transportation 
 Beat (app), a ride-hailing app 
 Beat, a model of the Daiichi Kosho Whisper paramotor
 Chevrolet Beat, a car
 Honda Beat, a car
 Honda FC50, or Honda Beat, a motor scooter

Other uses 
 Beat (acoustics), an interference pattern between two sounds of slightly different frequencies
 Beat (charity), a British charity that supports people with eating disorders
 Beat (drink), a citrus-flavored soft drink
 Beat (fencing), a simple preparatory motion
 Beats Electronics, or Beats by Dr. Dre, an American producer of audio products
 Beat, a time unit of Swatch Internet Time, and a range of watches
 Beating against the wind, a sailing manoeuvre

See also 
 
 
 The Beat (disambiguation)
 Back Beat (disambiguation)
 Beat It (disambiguation)
 Beet (disambiguation)
 Big beat (disambiguation)
 Downbeat (disambiguation)
 On the Beat (disambiguation)
 Upbeat (disambiguation)
 Beat Generation, a literary movement
 Beat reporting, a genre of journalism
 Beat 'em up, a video game genre
 Beate, a given name
 Beats International, a British dance music band and hip-hop collective
 Beetroot, or beet, or beets, a vegetable
 "Dr. Beat", a  1984 single by Miami Sound Machine
 New beat, Belgian underground music genre
 Saint-Béat, a place in Haute-Garonne, France